Doğuş Özdemiroğlu (born April 17, 1996) is a Turkish professional basketball player, who plays as Point guard for Darüşşafaka of the Turkish Basketbol Süper Ligi (BSL).

Professional career
At age 17, Özdemiroğlu joined the Basketball Super League and played in the 2013–14 season for the Darüşşafaka basketball club. He played 17 games over three seasons from 2013–2016 and averaged 6.3 points, 3.4 rebounds and 2.9 assists. 

During the 2015–16 season he played for Bahçeşehir Koleji S.K., playing 27 games and averaged 6.0 points, 2.9 rebounds and 1.9 assists per game.

During the 2014–15 season Özdemiroğlu was loaned to Acıbadem Üniversitesi to play for the A.Ü. Sports Klub and averaged 3.0 three-point baskets and 6.0 field goals made. He returned to play during the 2015–16 season, starting 18 out of 33 total games.

During the 2016–17 season, Özdemiroğlu was loaned to the Yeşilgiresun basketball club, playing 30 games with the team. He averaged 6.0 points, 2.8 rebounds and 1.8 assists per game.

Since 2017, Özdemiroğlu continues to play for Darüşşafaka.

Özdemiroğlu declared for the 2018 NBA Draft in which he was not selected.

References

External links
Doğuş Özdemiroğlu EuroCup Profile
Doğuş Özdemiroğlu TBLStat.net Profile
Doğuş Özdemiroğlu Eurobasket Profile
Doğuş Özdemiroğlu TBL Profile

Living people
1996 births
Bahçeşehir Koleji S.K. players
Darüşşafaka Basketbol players
Point guards
Sportspeople from Balıkesir
Turkish men's basketball players
Yeşilgiresun Belediye players